The 2006 Southland Conference men's basketball tournament took place March 7–12, 2006. The quarterfinal and semifinal rounds were played at the home arena of the higher seeded-teams, with the championship game played at Prather Coliseum in Natchitoches, Louisiana. Number 1 seed Northwestern State won the championship game over number 2 seed , 95–97.

The Demons earned the conference's automatic bid to the NCAA tournament where they won the first NCAA Tournament game in the round of 64 by knocking off Iowa, 64–63 in the opening round. The Demons lost in the second round to No. 6 seed West Virginia.

Format
The top eight eligible men's basketball teams in the Southland Conference receive a berth in the conference tournament.  After the conference season, teams were seeded by conference record.

Bracket

References

Tournament
Southland Conference men's basketball tournament
Southland Conference men's basketball tournament
Southland Conference men's basketball tournament